is a Japanese animated television series and the fifth entry in Nippon Animation's World Masterpiece Theater (which has been known by several different names). It was adapted from the 1908 novel Anne of Green Gables by Lucy Maud Montgomery. Produced by Nippon Animation in 1979, it was first broadcast on Fuji TV from January 7, 1979, to December 30, 1979. Fifty episodes were produced in total. The first six episodes were later edited into a compilation film released in 2010.

The series has been exported to neighbouring Asian countries and also to Europe and French Canada. An English dub produced by Leephy Studios aired on SABC and Japan Entertainment Television.

As with the novels, the animated version of Anne is beloved in Japan to this day. The "DVD Memorial BOX set" for Region 2 was released on August 22, 2008, and a Blu-Ray of the series was released in Japan on March 26, 2014. An anime series that serves as a prequel to the series, Kon'nichiwa Anne: Before Green Gables, premiered on April 5, 2009, in Japan.

Story 
Anne Shirley is a girl raised in an orphanage. Anne is accidentally sent to Miss Marilla Cuthbert and Mr. Matt Cuthbert, who had originally requested a boy. Miss Marilla is surprised at first. After Marilla learns of Anne's sad past, Anne gradually becomes an irreplaceable member of the Cuthbert family.

Summary 
The anime was directed by Isao Takahata. He chose to hold this version very true to the original source material, although his two previous works (Heidi, Girl of the Alps and 3000 Leagues in Search of Mother) had been adapted and altered.

Hayao Miyazaki did the scene setting and layout. Previously, he had worked on 3000 Leagues in Search of Mother, although he left the production and Nippon Animation after the first 15 episodes. Miyazaki noticed a difference in Takahata's philosophy of animation; Takahata stuck to controlled, realistic acting at the time, similar to his former work. Miyazaki had not intended to do other work with Takahata, but he had also not planned on becoming independent at this stage of his career.

Yoshifumi Kondō (近藤喜文) was selected for character design and animation director over Yoichi Kotabe (小田部羊一), who had stopped work with Takahata after 3000 Leagues in Search of Mother of the previous work. Kondo went on to work with Takahata on the films Grave of the Fireflies and Only Yesterday. The voice of Anne was provided by Eiko Yamada, who would become a staple of World Masterpiece Theatre anime, going on to play Lavinia in Princess Sarah and Jo March in Little Women (the latter of which also featured character designs by Kondo).

The first six episodes were edited together by Takahata into a 100-minute theatrical movie in 1989. A theatrical release was scheduled, but it received instead a very limited release in selected cities between July and August 1990. A VHS of the movie was also released in 1992. Both the theatrical release and the entire original series are available on Blu-ray.

Characters

Anne Shirley
Marilla Cuthbert
Matthew Cuthbert
Mrs. Spencer
Mrs. Rachel Lynde
Diana Barry
Mr. Barry
Mrs. Barry
Minnie May Barry
Gilbert Blythe
Mr. Phillips
Reverend and Mrs. Allan
Josie Pye
Ruby Gillis
Jane Andrews
Josephine Barry

Episodes

Music
 Opening Theme: "Kikoeru Kashira (I wonder if you can hear it)", composed by Akira Miyoshi, sung by Ritsuko Ohwada
 Ending Theme: "Samenai Yume", composed by Akira Miyoshi, sung by Ritsuko Ohwada

Reception
The show was well received upon its Japanese debut, helping lift the profile of the source material. It has subsequently appeared on best-anime lists conducted by TV Asahi's audience polls and those produced by outlets like Animage.

Shigeto Mori has received two posthumous JASRAC International Awards for his work on the series, first in 2003 and then in 2010.

References

External links

1979 anime television series debuts
1970s children's television series
Adventure anime and manga
Animated television series about orphans
Anne of Green Gables television series
Drama anime and manga
Historical anime and manga
Japanese children's animated adventure television series
Nippon Animation
Slice of life anime and manga
South African Broadcasting Corporation television shows
Studio Ghibli
Television series set in the 1870s
Television shows set in Canada
Television shows set in Prince Edward Island
World Masterpiece Theater series
Children's manga